Seghe is a city on the island of New Georgia, Solomon Islands, an independent country in the Pacific Ocean.

Transportation
The city is served by Seghe Airport, with flights on Solomon Airlines.

References

Populated places in the Solomon Islands